Paw Khin is a Burmese politician, previously served as a Pyithu Hluttaw member of parliament for Natogyi Township. In the 1990 Burmese general election, he was elected as an Pyithu Hluttaw MP, winning a majority of 42,015 (70% of the votes), but was never allowed to assume his seat.

Paw Khin was educated at Maymyo's St. Elvert High School and Myingyan State High School before matriculating from the Rangoon Institute of Technology (now Yangon Technological University) in 1975.

References

Members of Pyithu Hluttaw
National League for Democracy politicians
1947 births
Living people
People from Mandalay Region